The Cool S is a graffiti sign in popular culture that is typically doodled on children's notebooks or graffitied on walls. The exact origin of the Cool S is unknown, but an instance was found in a late 19th century geometry textbook and it became prevalent around the early 1970s as a part of graffiti culture.

Shape
The Cool S consists of 14 line segments, forming a stylized, pointed S-shape. It has also been compared to the infinity symbol. The tails (pointy ends) of the S appear to link underneath so that it loops around on itself in the same way as the infinity symbol does. The Cool S has no reflection symmetry, but has 2-fold rotational symmetry.

History

The origin of the Cool S is unclear.

In 1973, Jon Naar's famous photographs of graffiti in New York featured the symbol many times, identical to its modern form. Jean-Michel Basquiat's artworks occasionally had the symbol hidden somewhere, and in the one titled Olive Oil from 1982 it is labelled as the "classic S of graff".

The name "Superman S" comes from a belief that it was a symbol for Superman, whose costume features a stylized S in a diamond shape, but that shape is quite different. Although frequently referred to as the Stüssy S, Emmy Coats (who has worked alongside Shawn Stussy since 1985) has stated that it was never a symbol of the Californian surf company. In 2010 the company uploaded a video to Vimeo and later to YouTube in which one of Jon Naar's 1973 photographs of the symbol can be seen.

Paul Cobley, a professor in language and media at Middlesex University in London, said this about the Cool S symbol: "The reason kids go through this is probably because it's a Moebius strip. It can't be drawn continuously, but it does have a perpetual flow".

See also
 Henohenomoheji
 Emoticon
 Twin mountain drawing
 Kilroy was here
 Sator Square

References

Drawing
Graffiti and unauthorised signage
Topology
Youth culture
Doodling motifs